Alexander Robert Nigel Parish  (born 1986), is an English ballet dancer and the first British dancer to be employed by the Mariinsky Ballet in St Petersburg, Russia.

Biography
Xander Parish born in 1987 in North Ferriby in the East Riding of Yorkshire, England. He began dancing at the age of 8, at the Skelton-Hooper School of Dance in Kingston upon Hull, under the direction of principal and former Royal Ballet and Northern Ballet Theatre soloist, Vanessa Hooper. In 1998, he was accepted into the Royal Ballet School, first attending the lower school at White Lodge, Richmond Park, then continuing his training at the upper school.

He graduated into the Royal Ballet in 2005, as a member of the corps de ballet. He remained with the company for five years, before joining the Mariinsky Ballet in St Petersburg, Russia in January 2010. He made his debut with the company performing the role of the poet in the ballet Chopiniana as a Coryphee, a corp member who may dance solo or even principal roles. He was promoted to soloist in March 2014 and principal dancer in July 2017 Parish has a sister, Demelza Parish, who is also a ballet dancer, currently employed by the Royal Ballet. 

In early March 2022, Parish decided to temporarily leave Russia due to Russian invasion of Ukraine. In August, he joined the Norwegian National Ballet.

Honours

He was appointed an Officer of the Order of the British Empire (OBE) in the 2019 New Year Honours for services to dance and UK/Russia cultural relations.

Repertoire includes

Giselle - Count Albrecht
Swan Lake - Prince Siegfried, Friends of the Prince
La Sylphide - Youths
The Sleeping Beauty - Prince Desire
Raymonda - Jean de Brienne, Beranger
Le Corsaire - Conrad
Chopiniana - Youth
Scheherazade - Zobeide's Slave
The Fountain of Bakhchisarai - Vaslav, Polish Youths
The Nutcracker - Nutcracker Prince, Elegant Cavaliers
Spartacus - Satyr
Romeo and Juliet - Romeo, Paris, Troubador
Apollo - Apollo
Serenade
Etudes
Symphony in C
Jewels - Emeralds and Diamonds
Ballet Imperial
A Midsummer Night's Dream - Demetrius
Sylvia - Aminta
Marguerite and Armand -Armand
In the Night
Adagio Hammerklavier
Variations for Two Couples
Anna Karenina - Count Vronsky, Tushkevich
Concerto DSCH
Without
La Nuit s'Acheve
Le Parc- Soloist
Infra
Intensio
Paquita-Andres
The Four Seasons
Russian Overture
Second I

Created roles
 DGV, Danse a Grand Vitesse – Choreographer: Christopher Wheeldon
 Seven Deadly Sins – Choreographer: William Tuckett
I'm Not Scared – Choreographer: Ilya Zhivou

Awards
 Ursula Moreton Choreographic Award – 1st Prize, 2003
 Ursula Moreton Choreographic Award – 2nd Prize, 2004
 Genee International Ballet Competition – Finalist, 2003
 Genee International Ballet Competition – Silver Medal, 2004
 Young British Dancer of the Year – 2nd Prize, 2004

References

Living people
1987 births
People educated at the Royal Ballet School
English male ballet dancers
Dancers of The Royal Ballet
Mariinsky Ballet dancers
Officers of the Order of the British Empire